The  was an infantry division in the Imperial Japanese Army. It was created 28 February 1945 in Sapporo, by cobbling together 43rd and 69th independent mixed brigades, converted to 3rd and 4th mixed brigades, plus headquarters of the 77th division. It was an oversized (because the constituent brigades were including a six infantry battalions each since July 1944) type C(hei) security division.

Action
The 89th division was assigned to the 5th area army 27 March 1945. The 3rd mixed brigade and headquarters were staying on the Iturup island, while parts of 4th mixed brigade part was garrisoning Shikotan island. Also, one battalion of the 4th mixed brigade was deployed on Kunashir Island. The 89th division has relied on heavy fortifications of Minami Chishima Fortress. After the Soviet Invasion of the Kuril Islands has started 18 August 1945, the Shikotan was invaded 1 September 1945, while Iturup garrison have surrendered 4 September 1945 without resistance, as the hostilities ceased 2 September 1945.

The majority of 89th division prisoners were returned by Soviet Union in 1948.

See also
 List of Japanese Infantry Divisions
 Independent Mixed Brigades (Imperial Japanese Army)

References and further reading

 List of Japanese Infantry Divisions
 Madej, W. Victor. Japanese Armed Forces Order of Battle, 1937-1945 [2 vols] Allentown, PA: 1981
This article incorporates material from the article 第89師団 (日本軍) in the Japanese Wikipedia, retrieved on 22 June 2016.

Japanese World War II divisions
Infantry divisions of Japan
Military units and formations established in 1945
Military units and formations disestablished in 1945
1945 establishments in Japan
1945 disestablishments in Japan